Augustus Walley (March 10, 1856 – April 9, 1938) was a Buffalo Soldier in the United States Army and a recipient of America's highest military decoration—the Medal of Honor—for his actions in the Indian Wars of the western United States.

Biography
Walley was born into slavery in Reisterstown, Maryland in 1856. He joined the army from Baltimore in November 1878.

On August 16, 1881, Walley was serving as a private in Company I of the 9th Cavalry Regiment. On that day, Walley participated in the Battle of Cuchillo Negro Creek in the Black Range Mountains near Cuchillo Negro Creek of New Mexico, where he was cited for "[b]ravery in action with hostile Apaches" for helping rescue stranded soldiers under heavy fire. His Lieutenant, George Ritter Burnett, and First Sergeant Moses Williams also received the Medal of Honor for their actions in this battle. Nine years later, on October 1, 1890, he was issued the Medal of Honor for his actions during the engagement.

Walley retired from the army in February 1907, having also served in the Spanish–American War and Philippine–American War. In 1918, he volunteered for duty at Camp Beauregard, Louisiana, but was turned away because of his age. Walley remained in Beauregard as a laborer for the Army for the remainder of the first world war. He died at age 82 and was buried at Saint Luke's Cemetery in Reisterstown, Maryland.

Medal of Honor

Rank and organization: Private, Company I, 9th U.S. Cavalry. Place and date: At Cuchillo Negro Mountains, N. Mex., August 16, 1881. Entered service at: ------. Birth: Reistertown, Md. Date of issue: October 1, 1890.

Citation:

Bravery in action with hostile Apaches.

See also

List of Medal of Honor recipients
List of Medal of Honor recipients for the Indian Wars
List of African American Medal of Honor recipients

References

American people of the Indian Wars
United States Army Medal of Honor recipients
Military personnel from Baltimore
United States Army soldiers
Buffalo Soldiers
1856 births
1938 deaths
American Indian Wars recipients of the Medal of Honor
People from Reistertown, Maryland